Wu Jiaduo (born 19 September 1977) is a Chinese-born German table tennis player.

Personal
At age seven, Wu received specialised table tennis training. In 1995, she became the Zhejiang provincial champion. She enrolled at the East China University of Science and Technology in 1997, studying economics. One year later, she relocated to Germany to further her table tennis career.

In 2005, she started to represent Germany at the international tournaments like ITTF Pro Tour.

She resides in Düsseldorf, Germany and plays for FSV Kroppach.

Career records
Singles (as of 3 October 2014)
Olympics: round of 16 (2012).
World Championships: round of 16 (2011).
World Cup appearances: 3. Record: 5–8th (2011).
Pro Tour runner-up (1): German Open 2008.
Pro Tour Grand Finals appearances: 5. Record: round of 16 (2007, 08, 09, 11).
European Championships: winner (2009).
Europe Top-12: Winner (2012).

Women's doubles
World Championships: round of 16 (2009, 13).
Pro Tour runner-up (1): German Open 2009.
Pro Tour Grand Finals appearances: 1. Record: SF (2009).
European Championships: SF (2007, 12).

Mixed doubles
World Championships: round of 64 (2007, 09).
European Championships: QF (2007).

Team
Olympics: 5 (2012).
World Championships: 3rd (2010).
World Team Cup: 5th (2007, 2013)
 World Cup: 5th (2011)

References

External links
 
 
 
 
 

1977 births
Living people
German female table tennis players
Table tennis players at the 2008 Summer Olympics
Olympic table tennis players of Germany
Chinese emigrants to Germany
Table tennis players at the 2012 Summer Olympics
People from Linhai
Table tennis players from Zhejiang
Naturalised table tennis players
Naturalized citizens of Germany
East China University of Science and Technology alumni
German sportspeople of Chinese descent